Hjalmar Pettersson (7 December 1906 – 25 August 2003) was a Swedish cyclist. He competed in the individual and team road race events at the 1928 Summer Olympics.

References

External links
 

1906 births
2003 deaths
Swedish male cyclists
Olympic cyclists of Sweden
Cyclists at the 1928 Summer Olympics
Sportspeople from Uppsala
20th-century Swedish people
21st-century Swedish people